Palestra de São Bernardo, commonly known as Palestra, is a currently inactive Brazilian football club based in São Bernardo do Campo, São Paulo.

They have a long-standing rivalry with nearby club EC São Bernardo, with whom they contest the Clássico Batateiro.

History
The club was founded on 1 September 1935 by the São Bernardo do Campo Italian community.

Stadium
Palestra de São Bernardo play their home games at Estádio Humberto de Alencar Castelo Branco, nicknamed Baetão. The stadium has a maximum capacity of 6,315 people.

References

Inactive football clubs in Brazil
Association football clubs established in 1935
Football clubs in São Paulo (state)
1935 establishments in Brazil